Nggosi is a suburb of Honiara, Solomon Islands and is located West of the main center and South East of White River.

Populated places in Guadalcanal Province
Suburbs of Honiara